The 2012–13 Pac-12 Conference men's basketball season began with practices in October 2012 and ended with the 2013 Pac-12 Conference men's basketball tournament from March 2013 at the MGM Grand Garden Arena in Paradise, Nevada. The regular season began on the first weekend of November 2012, with the conference schedule starting in December 2012. On March 9, 2013, the UCLA Bruins defeated the Washington Huskies 61–54 to clinch the regular season conference title. They were seeded as the No. 1 team in the Pac-12 Conference tournament in Las Vegas.

This was the second season under the Pac-12 Conference name. In July 2011, two schools joined the conference. Colorado came from the Big 12 and Utah arrived from the Mountain West.

Pre-season

The Pac-12 media poll released on November 1, 2012:

1. Arizona (15 first-place votes), 403 points
2. UCLA (16), 402
3. California (3), 325
4. Stanford, 296
5. Washington (2), 278
6. Colorado, 262
7. Oregon, 217
8. Oregon State, 166
9. USC, 163
10. Washington State, 111
11. Arizona State, 107
12. Utah, 78

Rankings

Conference Schedule

Composite Matrix
This table summarizes the head-to-head results between teams in conference play.

Conference tournament

 March 2013 – Pac-12 Conference Basketball Tournament, MGM Grand Garden Arena, Paradise, Nevada.

Head coaches

Sean Miller, Arizona
Herb Sendek, Arizona State
Mike Montgomery, California
Tad Boyle, Colorado
Dana Altman, Oregon
Craig Robinson, Oregon State
Johnny Dawkins, Stanford
Ben Howland, UCLA
 Bob Cantu (interim head coach replaced Kevin O'Neill), USC
Larry Krystkowiak, Utah
Lorenzo Romar, Washington
Ken Bone, Washington State

Post season

NCAA tournament

National Invitation tournament

Highlights and notes
 November 1, 2012 – Media Day was held in San Francisco
 January 14, 2013 – USC head coach Kevin O'Neill was removed as head coach and associate head coach Bob Cantu took over as interim head coach, athletic director Pat Haden announced.
 March 2, 2013 – UCLA set a new attendance record of 13,727 at Pauley Pavilion
 March 6, 2013 - Washington State breaks a 19-game home losing against UCLA, defeating the Bruins 73–61.
 March 9, 2013 – UCLA won for the first time at Washington since January 2004.
 March 24, 2013 – UCLA relieved coach Ben Howland of his duties.
 March 30, 2013 – Steve Alford was named the UCLA Bruins' 13th head men's basketball coach

Awards and honors
 The Pac-12 Coach of the Year Award in both men's and women's basketball is now known as the John Wooden Coach of the Year Award.

Scholar-Athlete of the Year

Player-of-the-Week

 Nov. 12 – Ahmad Starks, Oregon State
Nov. 26 – Justin Cobbs, California
Dec. 10 – Brock Motum, Washington State
Dec. 24 – Eric Moreland, Oregon State
Jan. 7	 – Carrick Felix, Arizona State
Jan. 21 – Mark Lyons, Arizona
Feb. 4 – Josh Huestis, Stanford
Feb. 18 – Allen Crabbe, California
 Mar. 5 – Kyle Anderson, UCLA
 Nov. 19 – Askia Booker, Colorado
Dec. 3	 – Carrick Felix, Arizona State
Dec. 17 – André Roberson, Jr., Colorado
Dec. 31 – Shabazz Muhammad, UCLA
Jan. 14 – C. J. Wilcox, Washington
Jan. 28 – Carrick Felix, Arizona State
Feb. 11 – Allen Crabbe, California
 Feb. 25 – Justin Cobbs, California
 Mar. 11 – Brock Motum, Washington State

All-Americans

All-Pac-12 teams
Voting was by conference coaches:
Player of The Year: Allen Crabbe, Cal
Freshman of The Year: Shabazz Muhammad, UCLA; Jahii Carson, ASU
Defensive Player of The Year: André Roberson, Colorado
Most Improved Player of The Year: Dwight Powell, Stanford
John R. Wooden Coach of the Year: Dana Altman, Oregon
First Team:

All-Academic
First Team:

Second Team:

USBWA All-District team
District VIII
 Player of The Year: André Roberson, Colorado

District IX

NBA Draft
Several players from the conference declared early for the NBA draft. The following all-conference selections were listed as seniors: Larry Drew II, Solomon Hill, Mark Lyons, E.J. Singler, Carrick Felix, and Brock Motum. Several players were among the 60 players invited to the 2013 NBA Draft Combine.

References

External links
2013–14 Pac-12 Men's Basketball Media Guide, contains review of 2012–13 season